Takurua was a Māori woman from the Ngāpuhi tribe (iwi) in northern New Zealand.

Takurua signed the Treaty of Waitangi on an unknown date in 1840, but it was probably in the Bay of Islands. She was one of a select few of Māori women who signed the treaty.

One source cites Takurua was the daughter of Te Kēmara and was married to Te Tai.

References

Ngāpuhi people
Signatories of the Treaty of Waitangi